The Good Wife is an American television series.

The Good Wife may also refer to:
 The Good Wife (Indian TV series)
 The Good Wife (Japanese TV series), a 2019 remake of the American series
 The Good Wife (film) or The Umbrella Woman, a 1987 Australian film
 The Good Wife (South Korean TV series), a 2016 remake of the American series
 A Good Wife, a 2016 Serbian film
 Goodwife, an archaic polite form of address for women

See also 
 A Good Lawyer's Wife, a 2003 South Korean film 
 "Good Wife, Wise Mother", an ideology coined by Nakamura Masanao in 1875
 "Good Wife's Guide", a magazine article rumored to have been published in the May 13, 1955 issue of Housekeeping Monthly
 Le Ménagier de Paris, a French medieval guidebook translated at The Good Wife's Guide
 A Good Woman (disambiguation)